Aleksandar Dimitrov Paunov (born June 19, 1949), is a Bulgarian politician and the leader of the current Communist Party of Bulgaria.

He was born in Pazardzhik and became an economist. After the collapse of the Socialist Bloc in 1989, the Bulgarian Communist Party was renamed the Bulgarian Socialist Party and shed its Marxist-Leninist ideology by moving towards social democratic positions. Several factions broke off from the Bulgarian Socialist Party, one of them being named the Communist Party of Bulgaria, which is currently led by Paunov. It is a member of the Socialist-led Coalition for Bulgaria.

Politics
Paunov is one of the only members of the Bulgarian National Assembly who voted against Bulgaria's entrance into NATO and the European Union. He also demanded the withdrawal of Bulgarian troops who were stationed in Karbala, Iraq.

External links
 Bulgarian parliament

1949 births
Living people
Bulgarian communists
Members of the National Assembly (Bulgaria)
Marxian economists
Bulgarian eurosceptics
People from Pazardzhik